Bedfordshire and Milton Keynes was a constituency of the European Parliament located in the United Kingdom, electing one Member of the European Parliament by the first-past-the-post electoral system. Created in 1994 from parts of Cambridge and Bedfordshire North and Suffolk, it was abolished in 1999 on the adoption of proportional representation for European elections in the United Kingdom. It was mostly succeeded by the East of England region, with the remaining part succeeded by the South East England region.

Boundaries

It consisted of the parliamentary constituencies of Luton North, Luton South, Mid Bedfordshire, Milton Keynes South West, North Bedfordshire, North East Milton Keynes and South West Bedfordshire.

Mid Bedfordshire and North Bedfordshire had previously been part of the Cambridge and Bedfordshire North constituency, while Luton North, Luton South, Milton Keynes South West, North East Milton Keynes and South West Bedfordshire had been part of the Bedfordshire South constituency.

Most of the area became part of the East of England constituency in 1999; the Milton Keynes constituencies became part of the South East England constituency.

MEPs

Election results

References

External links
 David Boothroyd's United Kingdom Election Results 

European Parliament constituencies in England (1979–1999)
Politics of Bedfordshire
1994 establishments in England
1999 disestablishments in England
Constituencies established in 1994
Constituencies disestablished in 1999